Ohiri Field  is a multi-purpose stadium located on the campus of Harvard University in the Allston neighborhood of Boston. (Although the core of the Harvard campus is in Cambridge, the athletic complex lies within Boston.) From its opening in 1983 until 2010, it was home to the Harvard Crimson men's and women's soccer teams; with the opening of a new stadium now known as Jordan Field, in September 2010, it has become the secondary home to both teams.

The stadium seats 1,500 people and has held as much as 5,200 people for NCAA tournament games.  It opened in 1983 and is named after former Harvard athlete Chris Ohiri.

Footnotes

External links
Ohiri Field. Men's Soccer. Harvard University Athletics official website
Soldiers Field Soccer Stadium. Men's Soccer. Harvard University Athletics official website

Soccer venues in Massachusetts
Harvard University
Harvard Crimson
Multi-purpose stadiums in the United States
Sports venues in Boston
Buildings and structures completed in 1983
Sports venues completed in 1983
1983 establishments in Massachusetts